Pressig is a municipality  in the district of Kronach, administrative region Upper Franconia, in Bavaria in Germany.

References

Kronach (district)